This is a list of tennis players who have represented the Canada Davis Cup team in an official Davis Cup match. Canada has taken part in the competition since 1913.

Davis Cup players

*Active players in bold, statistics as of February 5, 2018

References

Lists of Davis Cup tennis players
Davis
Davis Cup